In physics, the Clebsch–Gordan (CG) coefficients are numbers that arise in angular momentum coupling in quantum mechanics.  They appear as the expansion coefficients of total angular momentum eigenstates in an uncoupled tensor product basis. In more mathematical terms, the CG coefficients are used in representation theory, particularly of compact Lie groups, to perform the explicit direct sum decomposition of the tensor product of two irreducible representations (i.e., a reducible representation into irreducible representations, in cases where the numbers and types of irreducible components are already known abstractly). The name derives from the German mathematicians Alfred Clebsch and Paul Gordan, who encountered an equivalent problem in invariant theory.

From a vector calculus perspective, the CG coefficients associated with the SO(3) group can be defined simply in terms of integrals of products of spherical harmonics and their complex conjugates. The addition of spins in quantum-mechanical terms can be read directly from this approach as spherical harmonics are eigenfunctions of total angular momentum and projection thereof onto an axis, and the integrals correspond to the Hilbert space inner product. From the formal definition of angular momentum, recursion relations for the Clebsch–Gordan coefficients can be found. There also exist complicated explicit formulas for their direct calculation.

The formulas below use Dirac's bra–ket notation and the Condon–Shortley phase convention is adopted.

Review of the angular momentum operators 

where  is the Levi-Civita symbol. Together the three operators define a vector operator, a rank one Cartesian tensor operator,

It is also known as a spherical vector, since it is also a spherical tensor operator. It is only for rank one that spherical tensor operators coincide with the Cartesian tensor operators.

This is an example of a Casimir operator. It is diagonal and its eigenvalue characterizes the particular irreducible representation of the angular momentum algebra . This is physically interpreted as the square of the total angular momentum of the states on which the representation acts.

One can also define raising and lowering operators, the so-called ladder operators,

Spherical basis for  angular momentum eigenstates 

When two Hermitian operators commute, a common set of eigenstates exists. From the commutation relations, the possible eigenvalues can be found.

They comprise the spherical basis, are complete, and satisfy the following eigenvalue equations,

where the ladder coefficient is given by:

The choice made in this article is in agreement with the Condon–Shortley phase convention. The angular momentum states are orthogonal (because their eigenvalues with respect to a Hermitian operator are distinct) and are assumed to be normalized,

Here the italicized  and  denote integer or half-integer angular momentum quantum numbers of a particle or of a system. The  symbols are Kronecker deltas.

Tensor product space 
Examples include the spin and the orbital angular momentum of a single electron, or the spins of two electrons, or the orbital angular momenta of two electrons. Mathematically, this means that the angular momentum operators act on a space  of dimension  and also on a space  of dimension . We are then going to define a family of "total angular momentum" operators acting on the tensor product space , which has dimension . The action of the total angular momentum operator on this space constitutes a representation of the su(2) Lie algebra, but a reducible one. The reduction of this reducible representation into irreducible pieces is the goal of Clebsch–Gordan theory.

Let  be the -dimensional vector space spanned by the states

and  the -dimensional vector space spanned by the states

The tensor product of these spaces, has a -dimensional uncoupled basis

and

where  denotes the identity operator.

The total angular momentum operators can be shown to satisfy the very same commutation relations, 

where . Indeed, the preceding construction is the standard method for constructing an action of a Lie algebra on a tensor product representation.

Hence, a set of coupled eigenstates exist for the total angular momentum operator as well,

Note that it is common to omit the  part.

The total angular momentum quantum number  must satisfy the triangular condition that

such that the three nonnegative integer or half-integer values could correspond to the three sides of a triangle.

The total number of total angular momentum eigenstates is necessarily equal to the dimension of :

Thus, the six-dimensional tensor product representation decomposes as the direct sum of a two-dimensional representation and a four-dimensional representation.

The goal is now to describe the preceding decomposition explicitly, that is, to explicitly describe basis elements in the tensor product space for each of the component representations that arise.

The total angular momentum states form an orthonormal basis of :

These rules may be iterated to, e.g., combine  doublets (=1/2) to obtain the  Clebsch-Gordan decomposition series, (Catalan's triangle),

where  is the integer floor function; and the number preceding the boldface irreducible representation dimensionality label indicates multiplicity of that representation in the representation reduction. For instance, from this formula,  addition of three spin 1/2s yields a spin 3/2 and two spin 1/2s, .

Formal definition of Clebsch–Gordan coefficients 

The coupled states can be expanded via the completeness relation (resolution of identity) in the uncoupled basis

The expansion coefficients

are the Clebsch–Gordan coefficients. Another common notation is
.

Applying the operators

to both sides of the defining equation shows that the Clebsch–Gordan coefficients can only be nonzero when

Recursion relations 

The recursion relations were discovered by physicist Giulio Racah from the Hebrew University of Jerusalem in 1941.

Applying the total angular momentum raising and lowering operators

to the left hand side of the defining equation gives

Applying the same operators to the right hand side gives

Combining these results gives recursion relations for the Clebsch–Gordan coefficients:

Taking the upper sign with the condition that  gives initial recursion relation:

In the Condon–Shortley phase convention, one adds the constraint that

(and is therefore also real).

The Clebsch–Gordan coefficients  can then be found from these recursion relations.  The normalization is fixed by the requirement that the sum of the squares, which equivalent to the requirement that the norm of the state  must be one.

Repeated use of that equation gives all coefficients.

This procedure to find the Clebsch–Gordan coefficients shows that they are all real in the Condon–Shortley phase convention.

Explicit expression

Orthogonality relations 

These are most clearly written down by introducing the alternative notation

The first orthogonality relation is

(derived from the fact that ) and the second one is

Special cases 

For  the Clebsch–Gordan coefficients are given by

For  and  we have

For  and  we have

For  we have

For ,  we have

For  we have

Symmetry properties 

A convenient way to derive these relations is by converting the Clebsch–Gordan coefficients to Wigner 3-j symbols using .  The symmetry properties of Wigner 3-j symbols are much simpler.

Rules for phase factors 

Care is needed when simplifying phase factors: a quantum number may be a half-integer rather than an integer, therefore  is not necessarily  for a given quantum number  unless it can be proven to be an integer.  Instead, it is replaced by the following weaker rule:

for any angular-momentum-like quantum number .

It is useful to observe that any phase factor for a given  pair can be reduced to the canonical form:

Converting phase factors into this form makes it easy to tell whether two phase factors are equivalent. (Note that this form is only locally canonical: it fails to take into account the rules that govern combinations of  pairs such as the one described in the next paragraph.)

This identity also holds if the sign of any  is reversed, or if any of them are substituted with an  instead.

Relation to Wigner 3-j symbols 

Clebsch–Gordan coefficients are related to Wigner 3-j symbols which have more convenient symmetry relations.

Relation to Wigner D-matrices

Relation to spherical harmonics 

In the case where integers are involved, the coefficients can be related to integrals of spherical harmonics:

It follows from this and orthonormality of the spherical harmonics that CG coefficients are in fact the expansion coefficients of a product of two spherical harmonics in terms of a single spherical harmonic:

Other Properties

Clebsch–Gordan coefficients for specific groups 

For arbitrary groups and their representations, Clebsch–Gordan coefficients are not known in general. However, algorithms to produce Clebsch–Gordan coefficients for the special unitary group SU(n) are known. In particular, SU(3) Clebsch-Gordan coefficients have been computed and tabulated because of their utility in characterizing hadronic decays, where a flavor-SU(3) symmetry exists that relates the up, down, and strange quarks. A web interface for tabulating SU(N) Clebsch–Gordan coefficients is readily available.

Clebsch–Gordan coefficients for symmetric group are also known as Kronecker coefficients.

See also

 3-j symbol
 6-j symbol
 9-j symbol
 Racah W-coefficient
 Spherical harmonics
 Spherical basis
 Tensor products of representations
 Associated Legendre polynomials
 Angular momentum
 Angular momentum coupling
 Total angular momentum quantum number
 Azimuthal quantum number
 Table of Clebsch–Gordan coefficients
 Wigner D-matrix
 Wigner–Eckart theorem
 Angular momentum diagrams (quantum mechanics)
 Clebsch–Gordan coefficient for SU(3)
 Littlewood–Richardson coefficient

Remarks

Notes

References

 

 

 Albert Messiah (1966). Quantum Mechanics (Vols. I & II), English translation from French by G. M. Temmer. North Holland,  John Wiley & Sons.

External links

 Clebsch–Gordan, 3-j and 6-j Coefficient Web Calculator
 Downloadable Clebsch–Gordan Coefficient Calculator for Mac and Windows
 Web interface for tabulating SU(N) Clebsch–Gordan coefficients

Further reading

Rotation in three dimensions
Rotational symmetry
Representation theory of Lie groups
Quantum mechanics
Mathematical physics